Angelika Dreock-Käser (born 2 March 1967) is a German para-cyclist who represented Germany at the 2020 Summer Paralympics.

Career
Dreock-Käser represented Germany at the 2020 Summer Paralympics in the women's road race T1–2 event and won a silver medal. She also competed in the women's road time trial T1–2 event and won a bronze medal.

References

External links
 

Living people
1967 births
German female cyclists
People from Bremervörde
Cyclists at the 2020 Summer Paralympics
Medalists at the 2020 Summer Paralympics
Paralympic medalists in cycling
Paralympic silver medalists for Germany
Paralympic bronze medalists for Germany
Paralympic cyclists of Germany
Cyclists from Lower Saxony
20th-century German women
21st-century German women